The 1971–72 WHL season was the 20th season of the Western Hockey League. Six teams played a 72-game schedule, and the Denver Spurs were the Lester Patrick Cup champions, defeating the Portland Buckaroos four games to one in the final series.

Art Jones of Portland led the league in scoring and Fran Huck of Denver was named the most valuable player.

Final standings 

bold - qualified for playoffs

Playoffs 

The Portland Buckaroos defeated the Phoenix Roadrunnrers 4 games to 1 to win the Lester Patrick Cup.

References

Bibliography

 

Western Hockey League (1952–1974) seasons
1971–72 in American ice hockey by league
1971–72 in Canadian ice hockey by league